Brat Camp was a reality television show.

The first season, featuring RedCliff Ascent, won an International Emmy. Subsequent seasons saw declining viewership. The American version of Brat Camp was cancelled after its one-season run, but is being aired in Canada on Slice as of early 2007. The UK version was also aired in the United States in 2004 on ABC Family, and its popularity resulted in ABC ordering an American version.

On 24 August 2007, it was announced that the show had been cancelled, along with shows such as Celebrity Big Brother and You Are What You Eat.

United Kingdom

There have been five UK series.

The format is distributed internationally by DRG and has been adapted in several territories.

Series 1

Redcliff Ascent was asked to be featured in a second round of Brat Camp, but declined when it became obvious that the next season would require tougher kids and increased drama. The first series won an International Emmy Award for best non-scripted program. RedCliff Ascent spokesman, Stephen Schultz mentioned that "RedCliff Ascent is a treatment program, not a TV show". James Fonfe' became quite a media icon after his return to the UK. While most students struggle a bit upon return home, a year later James was working with his mother teaching swimming and had been drug-free, as verified by urine tests administered by his mother. As James put it: "You do feel trapped. But it is worth it. I am glad I did it. I wouldn’t go back now, but I don’t have a problem any more – if I had a problem in the future then I would go back."

Series 2

Series 3

The third series followed a girls-only group with the principal activity being a single extended hike. This series aired from 8 February 2006 on Channel 4. In addition, Brat Camp Unseen, a half-hour show with additional footage, was aired on E4.

Series 4

The fourth series that followed a girls-only group, Family Brat Camp, aired from 4 October 2006, and brings along the parents of the four children to make them take responsibility for their kids' behaviour at the SUWS wilderness program in Idaho.

Sadly, Benjamin died of a drug overdose in 2009.

Series 5

The fifth UK version aired October 2007. According to a statement on ANASAZI's homepage, a special 21-day version of their normal 42-day program is being developed for television, after which Twenty Twenty Television will fund the remainder of the treatment if the parents and clinical staff consider it necessary.

United States

Germany
The German version is called Teenager außer Kontrolle (engl. Teenagers out of control) . The show is being broadcast on RTL

Series 1

Aspen Education Group revealed in a job ad that children from Holland would also be in a show.

Series 2

Series 3
The production company searched for new candidates for a third season. Filming did take place during the summer of 2008 at a wilderness program called Monarch Center in Colorado. It will be broadcast at RTL starting from 25 February 2009.

Netherlands
The Netherlands version did after extended negotiations end up with a customized program, where the teenagers were sent to Kenya. It was called Van etter tot engel (English: From brat to angel) and was aired by RTL5 in the fall of 2006. Keith Bakker was the teenagers' head coach.

In the news
The UK version of the show generated some criticism. An influential children's charity, Barnardo's, expressed concerns that the TV show sends a message to parents that a short period of "tough love" can resolve any problems.

The show also received some criticism for an incident in which a young woman was forced to strip to their underwear and then made to have a cavity search, the initial stages of which were implied but not shown.

See also
Behavior modification
Gooning
Intervention (TV series)
Teen escort company
Therapeutic boarding school
Residential treatment center
Wilderness therapy

Notes

External links
Brat Camp at Channel4.com
A website dedicated to Brat Camps
Production company programme entry
Redcliff Ascent, UK series 1
Turnabout ranch, UK series 2
Aspen Achievement Academy, UK series 3
SageWalk Wilderness School, US serie
Aspen Family Camp, UK series 4, German serie, Dutch serie
Anasazi Foundation, UK series 5
Nederland version

2000s American reality television series
2000s British reality television series
2005 American television series debuts
2007 American television series endings
2005 British television series debuts
2007 British television series endings
ABC Family original programming
American Broadcasting Company original programming
American television series based on British television series
Channel 4 original programming
International Emmy Award for Best Non-Scripted Entertainment winners